The Most Unknown may refer to:

 The Most Unknown (film)
 The Most Known Unknown -- DVD recorded by The Acacia Strain